Maxime Camille Cochin (27 May 1927 – 22 August 2000) was a French boxer. He competed in the men's flyweight event at the 1948 Summer Olympics.

References

1927 births
2000 deaths
French male boxers
Olympic boxers of France
Boxers at the 1948 Summer Olympics
Flyweight boxers